Lisa Stephens Disbrow (born September 29, 1962) is the former United States Under Secretary of the Air Force. From January 20 to May 16, 2017, she served as the Acting United States Secretary of the Air Force until Heather Wilson assumed the office. Previously, Disbrow served as Acting Under Secretary of the Air Force from January 2015 until she was confirmed by the Senate as the Under Secretary in January 2016. She was also confirmed by the Senate and served as the Assistant Secretary of the Air Force for Financial Management and Comptroller from 2014 to 2016.

Disbrow graduated from the University of Virginia in 1984 and served as an officer in the United States Air Force working primarily in intelligence. In 1992, after Operation Desert storm, she left active service and continued to serve in the US Air Force Reserve. She continued her intelligence work both in her civilian work as a senior systems engineer for the National Reconnaissance Office and in her AF reserve role.

From 1995 to 2014, Disbrow held a variety of positions on the Joint Staff as a senior civilian, including the Joint Staff Vice Director for Force Structure, Resources and Assessment. While assigned to the Joint Staff, from 2006 to 2007 Disbrow was detailed to the president's National Security Advisor as the special advisor for policy implementation and execution at the White House. She assisted in planning and implementing the National Security Strategy and advised the White House on issues across the federal government.

Her twenty-three years of uniformed service culminated in 2008 when she retired as a colonel from the Air Force Reserve while serving as special assistant to the director of programs, Headquarters Air Force.

Disbrow resigned her position as Under Secretary of the Air Force on June 30, 2017.

Disbrow currently serves as a Director on the Board of Mercury Systems; BlackBerry; the Logistics Management Institute (LMI); the Sequa Corp and she Chairs the Board for Hensoldt, Inc. She is a Senior Fellow at the Johns Hopkins University Applied Physics Laboratory and serves on the board of the Wounded Warrior Project.

References

External links

|-

1962 births
Living people
People from Clifton Forge, Virginia
United States Department of Defense officials
United States Secretaries of the Air Force
United States Under Secretaries of the Air Force
Women in the United States Air Force